Son Seung-yeon (born September 15, 1993), also known as Sonnet Son,  is a South Korean singer. She is a winner of The Voice of Korea and is a frequent guest on the singing competition show Immortal Songs 2.

Discography

Albums

Singles

Soundtrack appearances

Other charted songs

Filmography

Musical
 The Bodyguard (Korean-language rendition) as Rachel Marro, Dec 15, 2016 - Mar 05, 2017.
 Wicked (Korean-language rendition) as Elphaba, Feb 12, 2021 - May 1, 2021.
 Wicked (Korean-language rendition) (Transfer to Busan) as Elphaba, May 20, 2021 - June 27, 2021.
 Six (Korean-language rendition) as Catherine of Aragon, March 31, 2023- June 25, 2023

Television shows

Immortal Songs 2

King of Mask Singer

Notes

References

1993 births
Living people
K-pop singers
South Korean women pop singers
South Korean rhythm and blues singers
The Voice (franchise) winners
South Korean female idols
The Voice of Korea contestants
School of Performing Arts Seoul alumni
21st-century South Korean singers
21st-century South Korean women singers